The 1993–94 season was Galatasaray's 90th in existence and the 36th consecutive season in the 1. Lig. This article shows statistics of the club's players in the season, and also lists all matches that the club have played in the season.

Squad statistics

Players in / out

In

Out

1. Lig

Standings

Matches

Türkiye Kupası
Kick-off listed in local time (EET)

6th round

1/4 final

1/2 final

Final

UEFA Champions League

1st round

2nd round

Group stage

Süper Kupa-Cumhurbaşkanlığı Kupası
Kick-off listed in local time (EET)

1993

1994

Friendly Matches
Kick-off listed in local time (EET)

TSYD Kupası

Attendance

References

 Tuncay, Bülent (2002). Galatasaray Tarihi. Yapı Kredi Yayınları

External links
 Galatasaray Sports Club Official Website 
 Turkish Football Federation – Galatasaray A.Ş. 
 uefa.com – Galatasaray AŞ

Galatasaray S.K. (football) seasons
Galatasaray
Turkish football championship-winning seasons
1990s in Istanbul
Galatasaray Sports Club 1993–94 season